tetrabromide may refer to:

Carbon tetrabromide, CBr4
Hafnium tetrabromide, HfBr4
Platinum tetrabromide, PtBr4
Silicon tetrabromide, SiBr4
Tellurium tetrabromide, TeBr4
Tin tetrabromide, SnBr4
Titanium tetrabromide, TiBr4
Uranium tetrabromide, UBr4
Zirconium tetrabromide, ZrBr4

See also
Acetylene tetrabromide or Tetrabromoethane (TBE), C2H2Br4
tetrafluoride
tetrachloride
tetraiodide